This is a timeline of the history of organized crime.

1870s: 1870 - 1871 - 1872 - 1873 - 1874 - 1875 - 1876 - 1877 - 1878 - 1879
1880s: 1880 - 1881 - 1882 - 1883 - 1884 - 1885 - 1886 - 1887 - 1888 - 1889
1890s: 1890 - 1891 - 1892 - 1893 - 1894 - 1895 - 1896 - 1897 - 1898 - 1899
1900s: 1900 - 1901 - 1902 - 1903 - 1904 - 1905 - 1906 - 1907 - 1908 - 1909
1910s: 1910 - 1911 - 1912 - 1913 - 1914 - 1915 - 1916 - 1917 - 1918 - 1919
1920s: 1920 - 1921 - 1922 - 1923 - 1924 - 1925 - 1926 - 1927 - 1928 - 1929
1930s: 1930 - 1931 - 1932 - 1933 - 1934 - 1935 - 1936 - 1937 - 1938 - 1939
1940s: 1940 - 1941 - 1942 - 1943 - 1944 - 1945 - 1946 - 1947 - 1948 - 1949
1950s: 1950 - 1951 - 1952 - 1953 - 1954 - 1955 - 1956 - 1957 - 1958 - 1959
1960s: 1960 - 1961 - 1962 - 1963 - 1964 - 1965 - 1966 - 1967 - 1968 - 1969
1970s: 1970 - 1971 - 1972 - 1973 - 1974 - 1975 - 1976 - 1977 - 1978 - 1979
1980s: 1980 - 1981 - 1982 - 1983 - 1984 - 1985 - 1986 - 1987 - 1988 - 1989
1990s: 1990 - 1991 - 1992 - 1993 - 1994 - 1995 - 1996 - 1997 - 1998 - 1999
2000s: 2000 - 2001 - 2002 - 2003 - 2004 - 2005 - 2006 - 2007 - 2008 - 2009
2010s: 2010 - 2011 - 2012 - 2013  - 2014 - 2015 - 2016 - 2017 - 2018 - 2019
2020s: 2020 - 2021 - 2022 - 2023 - 2024 - 2025 - 2026 - 2027 - 2028 - 2029

See also
Timeline of organized crime in Chicago

References
 Sources included are Carl Sifakis's The Mafia Encyclopedia, Herbert Asbury's The Gangs of New York and others. Online references also include Thomas P. Hunt's Mafia Chronology, John Dickie's Cosa Nostra history and The Chronological History of La Cosa Nostra in the United States: January 1920 - August 1987 compiled by the United States Department of Justice Criminal Division's Organized Crime Intelligence and Analysis Unit.

 
Organized crime
Crime
Organized crime
Organized crime